Murphy Middle School may refer to schools in:

 Plano Independent School District, Texas
 Cherokee County Schools (North Carolina)